James C. Selman (born February 7, 1942) is an American consultant, coach, and author.

Born in Oklahoma City, Selman received his B.A. from the University of Oklahoma in 1965, where he majored in social psychology and philosophy.

Selman is described as being "in the forefront in helping major companies embrace the concept" of "contextual management". He formed Selman & Associates in 1976, and "began research into the nature of culture and large-scale systems change". In 1984, he partnered with Werner Erhard to form Transformational Technologies, a consulting and training franchise operation, which served as the corporate division of Werner Erhard & Associates, with Selman as its first president. In his capacity there, he was noted to have said of his philosophy of management, "when we talk management technology, what we are talking about is a rigorously tested and challenged body of distinction for having access to whatever the phenomenon of management really is".

In October 1987, Selman moderated a televised broadcast that featured Werner Erhard in discussion with top sports coaches John Wooden, Red Auerbach, Timothy Gallwey and George Allen discussing principles of coaching across all disciplines. They sought to identify distinctions found in coaching, regardless of the subject being coached. In 1989, with the late Professor Roger Evered (U.S. Naval Graduate School at Monterrey), Selman documented the outcome in the first article on organizational coaching, titled "Coaching and the Art of Management". In another article, "Leadership and Innovation: Relating to Circumstances and Change", Selman identifies six ways of responding to change.

Selman was described as "an enormously powerful man with a deep voice and a way of speaking that held people's attention and inspired confidence". Selman & Associates became Paracomm Partners International in 1988. Selman is the host and co-producer with Phyllis Haynes of the podcast and web program Possible Futures, conversations and commentary to explore ideas and decision making and their relationship to possible futures.

Bibliography
"Managers Anonymous," New Management, 1988 (Vol. 6, Issue 2)
"Coaching and the Art of Management," Organizational Dynamics, 1989
"Coaching: Beyond Management," 10-hour video course & workbook, 1989
"Rethinking the Fundamentals," Canadian Utilities Limited (internal corporate publication), 1990
"Ground Rules for Effective Teams," TransAlta Utilities, 1992
"Empowering Organizational Culture," TransAlta Utilities, 1992
"Dialogue on Commitment," Journal of Management Inquiry, 1995
Retiring Right The Freeway Guide: How to Invent the Rest of Your Life! (Audiobook; Waterside, 2007)
Leadership (2007)
The Elder (with Dr. Marc B. Cooper; Sahalie Press, 2011)
Living in a Real-Time World: 6 Capabilities to Prepare Us for an Unimaginable Future (Jan 7, 2019)
Serene Ambition in a Real-Time World (Aug 27, 2020)

References

External links
 Amazon.com author page for Jim Selman
 YouTube channel page for Possible Futures with Jim Selman

1942 births
Living people
Writers from Oklahoma City
University of Oklahoma alumni
American consultants
American non-fiction writers